NBM may refer to:
 Nil by mouth, a UK medical instruction
 NBM Publishing, a publisher of graphic novels
 National Building Museum in Washington, DC
 Nuestra Belleza México, national beauty pageant of Mexico
 Basal nucleus of meynert, a nucleus of nerve cells in the brain
 NetBeans Module, a software component for the NetBeans platform
 New Buffalo (Amtrak station), Michigan, United States; Amtrak station code NBM
 NAMCO BANDAI Mirai-Kenkyusho
 New Britain masked-owl (Tyto aurantia)
 Narrow-footed bristly mouse (Neacomys tenuipes)
 National Bird-Feeding Month
 NBM Railways, Canadian railway company